Sidalcea is a genus (approx. 25 species) of the botanical family Malvaceae. It contains several species of flowering plants known generally as checkerblooms or checkermallows, or prairie mallows in the United Kingdom. They can be annuals or perennials, some rhizomatous.  They are native to West and Central North America.

In mid- to late summer the clumps of toothed basal leaves produce erect flowering stems, with 5-petalled mallow-type flowers in terminal racemes, in shades of pink, white and purple.

Sidalcea is generally diploid (2n = 20), but polyploidy (4n, 6n) also occurs.

Annuality appears to have evolved multiple times (4+) within this genus, although an ancestral annual state with annual paraphyly is also possible. Further, evolution rates within annual Sidalcea lineages appear to be faster than those of perennial lineages, at least when examining nuclear ribosomal DNA (internal and external transcribed spacer regions).

Selected species:

(A = annual, P = perennial)
Sidalcea asprella (P)
Sidalcea calycosa – annual checkerbloom (A)
Sidalcea campestris – meadow checkermallow (P)
Sidalcea candida – white checkerbloom (P)
Sidalcea covillei – Owens Valley sidalcea (P)
Sidalcea cusickii  – Cusick's checkermallow (P)
Sidalcea diploscypha – fringed checkerbloom (A)
Sidalcea glaucescens – waxy checkerbloom (P)
Sidalcea gigantea (P)
Sidalcea hartwegii – valley checkerbloom (A)
Sidalcea hendersonii – Henderson's checkermallow (P)
Sidalcea hickmanii – chaparral checkerbloom (P)
Sidalcea hirsuta – hairy checkerbloom (A)
Sidalcea hirtipes - hairy-stemmed checker-mallow (P)
Sidalcea keckii – Keck's checkerbloom (A)
Sidalcea malachroides – mapleleaf checkerbloom (P)
Sidalcea malviflora – dwarf checkerbloom
Sidalcea multifida (P)
Sidalcea nelsoniana – Nelson's checkermallow (threatened)
Sidalcea neomexicana – Salt Spring checkerbloom (P)
Sidalcea oregana – Oregon checkerbloom (miniature hollyhock)
Sidalcea oregana var. calva – Wenatchee Mountains checkermallow
Sidalcea pedata – birdfooted checkerbloom, Big Bear checkerbloom (P)
Sidalcea ranunculacea – marsh checkerbloom
Sidalcea reptans – Sierra checkerbloom
Sidalcea robusta – Butte County checkerbloom (P)
Sidalcea stipularis – Scadden Flat checkerbloom (P)
Sidalcea virgata (P)

Garden cultivars are hybrids between S. candida and S. malviflora. The perennial cultivars "Elsie Heugh", 'Oberon' and "William Smith" have gained the Royal Horticultural Society's Award of Garden Merit.

Gallery

References

 
 US Fish and Wildlife page on Sidalcea nelsoniana.

External links

List of Sidalcea species in California at Calflora

 
Malvaceae genera